Richard Warsop (baptised 21 March 1781) was an English professional cricketer who played in two first-class cricket matches.

Warsop was from Nottingham and was one of four brothers, Thomas, William and Samuel, all of whom played for Nottingham Cricket Club. He played alongside Thomas for a combined Nottinghamshire and Leicestershire side in a first-class match in 1803 and made his other first-class appearance for Nottingham itself in 1826 in the side's first match which is considered first-class.

References

External links

1781 births
English cricketers
English cricketers of 1787 to 1825
Cricketers from Nottingham
Year of death unknown
Nottingham Cricket Club cricketers